Stenoma nubilella is a moth in the family Depressariidae. It was described by Heinrich Benno Möschler in 1882. It is found in Guyana.

References

Moths described in 1882
Stenoma